Usha may refer to:

Geography
Usha (city), an ancient city in western part of Galilee, Israel
Usha, Israel, a modern kibbutz
Usha, Bardhaman, a village in India

Personal name

Mythology
Ushas or Usha, a Vedic goddess
Uṣā, daughter of Asura Banasura
Usha Parinayam (Telugu: ఉషా పరిణయము; English: Marriage of Usha) Indian drama

Given name
Usha (actress) (born 1972), Indian actress and singer in Malayalam movies
Usha (Telugu singer) (born 1980), Indian singer in Telugu language
Usha Choudhari (born 1942), Indian National Congress politician
Usha Gupta, a fictional character in The Archers
Usha Haley, American academic
Usha Majere, a fictional character in Dragonlance
Usha Mangeshkar (born 1935), Indian singer
Usha Mehta (1920–2000), Indian Gandhian and freedom fighter
Usha Menon, Indian-British gynaecologist
Usha Sanyal, historian specializing in Asia
Usha Uthup (born 1947), Indian singer

Surname
K. K. Usha (1939–2020), Chief Justice of the high court of Kerala, India from 2000 to 2001
P. T. Usha (born 1964), Indian athlete

Acronyms
United States Housing Authority
United States Handball Association